Coco Hotahota (1 January 1941 — 8 March 2020) was a French Polynesian dancer and choreographer who founded the Temaeva troupe in 1962. He greatly contributed to choreography for the dance ’Ori tahiti.

Videography
Coco Hotahota : te maeva (2019)

References

1941 births
2020 deaths
French Polynesian dancers
French Polynesian choreographers